Henderson Scott Farm Historic District is a historic farm and national historic district located near Mebane, Alamance County, North Carolina. It encompasses 10 contributing buildings on a farm near Mebane.  The district includes the Federal style First Henderson Scott House (1836), Greek Revival style Second Henderson Scott House (1849), smokehouse (c. 1849), garage (1918), milk/butter House (c. 1900), Henderson Scott Store (1855), sheep barn (c. 1850), dairy barn 1 (c. 1935), chicken house (c. 1926), and wellhouse (c. 1926).

It was added to the National Register of Historic Places in 1987.

References

Historic districts on the National Register of Historic Places in North Carolina
Farms on the National Register of Historic Places in North Carolina
Federal architecture in North Carolina
Greek Revival houses in North Carolina
Houses in Alamance County, North Carolina
National Register of Historic Places in Alamance County, North Carolina